This is the discography of southern rap duo YoungBloodZ.

Albums

Studio albums

Compilation albums

Singles

Sean P

As featured artist

Promotional singles

Guest appearances
1998: "Jazzy Hoes" Jermaine Dupri featuring YoungBloodZ, 8Ball, Mr. Black & Too Short
2000: "Jumpin Down On Em" Baby D featung YoungBloodZ, Loko & Dollar
2001: "I'm Serious (Remix)" T.I. featuring Pastor Troy, YoungBloodZ & Lil' Jon
2001: "Know What's Up" Blaque featuring YoungBloodZ
2003: "Come Get Some" TLC featuring Lil Jon & Sean P of the YoungBloodZ
2004: "I Smoke, I Drank (Remix)" Body Head Bangerz featuring YoungBloodZ
2004: "Okay" Nivea featuring Lil Jon & YoungBloodZ
2004: "Jook Gal (Head Gawn Remix)" Elephant Man featuring YoungBloodZ, Twista & Kiprich
2005: "It's Whateva Wit Us" Three 6 Mafia featuring Ying Yang Twins & YoungBloodZ
2005: "I'm Sprung 2" T-Pain featuring Trick Daddy & YoungBloodZ
2005: "What It Do" B.J. featuring Sean P of the YoungBloodZ
2005: "Me And My Brother (Remix)" Ying Yang Twins featuring YoungBloodZ
2005: "Addicted to Pimpin" Too Short featuring YoungBloodZ
2005: "I Don't Care" Young Rome featuring YoungBloodZ
2006: "You Should Be My Girl" Sammie featuring Sean P of the YoungBloodZ
2007: "Jump Off" Sterling Simms featuring Sean P of the YoungBloodZ
2007: "Give In To Me (Double U Remix)" Michael Jackson featuring J-Bo of YoungBloodZ
2007: "Real Head Bussa" Teflon feat. YoungBloodZ
2007: "U Already Know (A-Town Remix)" 112 featuring YoungBloodZ
2010: "Attitude" EDIDON featuring YoungBloodZ, Stormey Coleman & Young Noble of Outlawz

Sean P

Notes

References

Hip hop discographies
Discographies of American artists